Heritage Records was an American record label founded in the early 1960s by Jerry Ross Productions. It was distributed by MGM Records.

It released a number of hits by groups such as The Cherry People, Euphoria, and Bill Deal and the Rhondels.

Ross discontinued the label by 1970 when he founded a new independently distributed label called Colossus Records.

External links 
Heritage album discography from BSN Pubs
509 F2d 930 Metro-Goldwyn-Mayer Inc v. Ross B Heritage Records Inc

American independent record labels
MGM Records
Record labels disestablished in 1970